Marjorie May "Maggie" Siggins (born 28 May 1942) is a Canadian journalist and writer. She was a recipient of the 1992 Governor General's Award for Literary Merit for her non-fiction work Revenge of the Land: A Century of Greed, Tragedy and Murder on a Saskatchewan Farm.  She was also the recipient of the 1986 Arthur Ellis Award for "Best true crime book" for her work A Canadian Tragedy, about the involvement of former Saskatchewan politician Colin Thatcher in the murder of his wife JoAnn Wilson. The book was later adapted into the television miniseries Love and Hate: The Story of Colin and JoAnn Thatcher.

Siggins is also noted as the author of a controversial biography of Louis Riel entitled Riel: A Life of Revolution. In Her Own time: A Class Reunion Inspires a Cultural History of Women and Bitter Embrace:White Society's Assault on the Woodland Cree are her last two books. Both Revenge of the Land and A Canadian Tragedy were adapted as television mini-series by the Canadian Broadcasting Corporation.

She is also the former chair of the Writers' Union of Canada.

Literary works 

 (Published in French under the title Riel: une vie de révolution, Québec-Amérique, 1997.)

 (Published in French under the title  Marie-Anne, La vie extraordinaire de la grand-mère de Louis Riel, Le Septentrion, 2011.)

References

External links
A brief biography and bibliography

1942 births
Living people
20th-century Canadian historians
Canadian journalists
Governor General's Award-winning non-fiction writers
21st-century Canadian historians
Toronto Metropolitan University alumni
Writers from Toronto
Canadian women historians
Women crime writers